Jesús María Expósito López (Santurce, Vizcaya, 23 December 1960 – Baracaldo, 31 May 1992) better known by his nickname Iosu was a Spanish rock musician, known as the guitarist from the punk rock band Eskorbuto.

Career 
Iosu Expósito was the guitarist and second singer of Eskorbuto since 1980 to early 1992. Iosu lived his entire life in the city of Santurce (Basque Country). During his childhood enjoyed listening to The Kinks, The Rolling Stones, The Who and then The Clash and Sex Pistols, also he was a great fan of football soccer. Expósito was part of the rock band Zarama, as bass player between 1977 and 1979. In the late 1970s, Expósito worked in a factory at the Santurce harbor. He wrote about the experience in his song, "Cualquier Lugar" (Anywhere). In 1980 formed Eskorbuto with Juanma Suárez and Pako Galán. Iosu would be the band's principle songwriter with occasional contributions from Juanma Suárez. In early 1991, he left the band due to health problems, and was absent from the Eskorbuto Mexico Tour, replaced by Iñaki "Gato". After three weeks, Expósito rejoined to the band, recording Demasiados enemigos... in 1991.

Death 
In 1991, Iosu began a treatment to quit heroin, as he had become very weak after years of addiction. On 31 May 1992, Iosu died of AIDS-related pneumonia, at the Hospital de Cruces in Baracaldo.

Discography with Eskorbuto 
Studio Albums
Zona Especial Norte EP (1984)
Eskizofrenia (1985)
Anti Todo (1986)
Ya No Quedan Más Cojones, Eskorbuto A Las Elecciones EP (1986)
Los demenciales chicos acelerados (1987)
Las mas macabras de las vidas (1988)
Demasiados enemigos... (1991)

Live Albums
Impuesto revolucionario (1986)
La Otro Cara Del Rock, Live at Villarreal Castellón (2004)
Sin fronteras, ni gobiernos (Recorded on 10 April 1987) (2007)

Demos
Jodiéndolo todo (1983)
Primeros ensayos 1982 (1992)
Que Corra La Sangre: Segunda Maketa (1998)

Singles
"Mucha Policia, Poca Diversión" (1983)
"Eskorbuto Al Parlamento" (1986)
"Adios Reina Mía" (1992)

References 

1960 births
1992 deaths
Spanish guitarists
Spanish male guitarists
Punk rock guitarists
Spanish rock singers
People from Santurtzi
Drug-related deaths in Spain
20th-century Spanish singers
AIDS-related deaths in Spain
20th-century guitarists
Rock en Español musicians
20th-century Spanish male singers